The following highways are numbered 211:

Canada
 Manitoba Provincial Road 211
 Newfoundland and Labrador Route 211
 Nova Scotia Route 211
 Prince Edward Island Route 211
 Quebec Route 211
 Saskatchewan Highway 211

China
 China National Highway 211

Costa Rica
 National Route 211

Japan
 Japan National Route 211

United States
 U.S. Route 211
 Alabama State Route 211
 Arkansas Highway 211
 California State Route 211
 Florida State Road 211
 Georgia State Route 211
 K-211 (Kansas highway)
 Kentucky Route 211
 Maine State Route 211 (former)
 Maryland Route 211 (former)
 Montana Secondary Highway 211
 New Mexico State Road 211
 New York State Route 211
 North Carolina Highway 211
 Ohio State Route 211
 Oregon Route 211
 South Carolina Highway 211
 Tennessee State Route 211
 Texas State Highway 211
 Utah State Route 211
 Virginia State Route 211
 Washington State Route 211
 West Virginia Route 211
 Wyoming Highway 211